Tan Sri Mohamad Fatmi bin Che Salleh (born 12 April 1957) is a Malaysian politician and was one of the longest serving Political Secretary to Najib Razak, former Prime Minister of Malaysia. He is a member of United Malays National Organisation (UMNO); a component party of Barisan Nasional (BN) coalition.

Mohamad Fatmi had contested but lost twice in both the 2008 general election and the 2013 general election for the Kota Bharu parliamentary seat. He had also earlier lost contesting the Kelantan State Legislative Assembly seat of Tanjong Mas in the 1995 general election.

Education 
He graduated from Tulane University, New Orleans Louisiana, USA with Master Of Business Administration (MBA) Finance in 1981 and hold Bachelor Of Science (BSc) Marketing from Southern Illinois University Carbondale, Illinois USA in 1979.

Mix parentage
Mohamad Fatmi came from a lineage of Chinese-Muslim. His great-great grandfather (Abdul Halim) came from China as a boy and was adopted by the Sultan of Kelantan. His great-great grandfather then was sent to Mecca to study the religion of Islam and came back as a religious scholar. He is well accepted among the Chinese and Malay community in Kelantan because of his well mannered persona.

Accompanying the Sultan of Kelantan
Mohamad Fatmi was one of the entourage for the Sultan of Kelantan during the Sultan's pilgrimage to the Holy Land Mecca from 10 November 2010 to 23 November 2010. Others in the entourage was the Chief Minister of Kelantan Datuk Haji Tuan Guru Nik Aziz Nik Mat and the Federal International Trade and Industry Minister Datuk Mustapa Mohamed.

Kota Baru UMNO Division
Mohamad Fatmi was elected as the new UMNO Chief for the Kota Baru Division. Previously the post was held by the infamous ex-UMNO De facto Law Minister and also ex-Pakatan Rakyat member, Datuk Seri Zaid Ibrahim.

Election results

Honours

Honours of Malaysia
  : 
  Commander of the Order of Loyalty to the Crown of Malaysia (PSM) - Tan Sri  (2016) 
  :
  Knight Commander of the Order of the Life of the Crown of Kelantan (DJMK) - Dato' (2006)
  :
  Companion Class I of the Order of Malacca (DMSM) - Datuk (1994)

References

1957 births
Living people
People from Kelantan
People from Kota Bharu
Malaysian people of Malay descent
Malaysian people of Chinese descent
Malaysian Muslims
United Malays National Organisation politicians
Commanders of the Order of Loyalty to the Crown of Malaysia
21st-century Malaysian politicians